Conewago Township may refer to one off the following places in the United States:
 Conewago Township, York County, Pennsylvania
 Conewago Township, Adams County, Pennsylvania
 Conewago Township, Dauphin County, Pennsylvania

Township name disambiguation pages